The Battle of An Bao took place from 5 to 6 May 1968 in Bình Định province during the Vietnam War when elements of the People's Army of Vietnam (PAVN) 3rd Division ambushed a unit of the 1st Battalion, 50th Infantry Regiment (Mechanized).

Background
As part of the May Offensive, PAVN Major General  Commander of Military Region 5 ordered the 3rd Division to attack the 1/50th Infantry in Bình Định Province with a series of large-scale ambushes.

Battle
At 08:00 the force of 9 M113s left LZ Uplift and headed north on Highway 1. By 10:00 the force had turned west off Highway 1 towards An Bao and were crossing some dry rice paddies in a clearing when they saw a group of approximately 15 PAVN run into the tree line. The M113s moved into line abreast and fired their machine guns into the tree line, but received no return fire. After searching the area, the force formed a defensive perimeter and the men ate lunch. As they were preparing to move out, the position was hit by rocket-propelled grenades (RPG) and recoilless rifle fire, which disabled the command and medical vehicles. Mortar rounds and machine gun fire then began to hit the U.S. position. Realizing that they were surrounded, the commander, Lieutenant Dennis E. Hinton, radioed for support.

The PAVN forces comprising the 97th Battalion, 2nd Regiment, and the 7th and 9th Battalions, 22nd Regiment began closing in on the U.S. position. Two M113s attacked on the PAVN positions, but both were soon disabled by RPGs. An M132 Armored Flamethrower was also hit, and its fuel tanks caught fire.

Company C reached the ambush site first and entered the clearing as the PAVN were closing in on the 15 men from Company A, the M113s moved in to form an armored perimeter but were soon hit by intense fire that killed and wounded several of the men of Company C. The 5 M48s then arrived in the clearing and the U.S. forces were able to withdraw and regroup while air and artillery strikes hit the clearing and surrounding forest.

At 17:00, a platoon of tanks from Landing Zone English and Company B, 1/50th Infantry, joined the force and the combined force re-entered the clearing to engage the PAVN. Despite the preceding hours of air and artillery strikes, heavy fire again met the U.S. force. The previously dry paddy fields were now filling up with water from a dike that had been deliberately opened or destroyed in the bombing, and the ground was now too muddy to be crossed. The Americans withdrew to establish a night defense position while air and artillery strikes continued.

At 03:30 on 6 May, the PAVN attacked the northwest of the U.S. perimeter with over a hundred soldiers advancing behind a hail of mortar and RPG fire that detonated an ammunition stockpile, injuring several Americans. The assault was beaten back and the PAVN withdrew at 05:00, dragging away their dead and wounded. Three Americans had been killed in the attack.

Later that morning, the Americans advanced again on the tree line, but the PAVN had left the battlefield, and they found only empty bunkers and fighting positions.

Aftermath
The battle was claimed as a U.S. victory with MACV claiming 117 PAVN were killed with 70 weapons recovered, with 18 Americans killed.

References

1968 in Vietnam
Battles involving the United States
Battles involving Vietnam
Battles and operations of the Vietnam War in 1968
Battles and operations of the Vietnam War
History of Bình Định province